David's Birthday, (Italian title: Il compleanno), is a 2009 Italian drama film directed by Marco Filiberti.

Plot
Two pairs of friends, Matteo & Francesca and Shary & Diego, decide to spend the summer together in a beach house at the foot of Mount Circeo. Matteo,  a psychologist, is married to Francesca with whom he has a five-year-old girl, Elena. Diego and Shary have a less stable relationship, having a son together, David, who attends college in the United States. David comes to Italy for the first time in five years to spend time with his family and celebrate his birthday. Upon David's arrival, he and Matteo begin to develop feelings for each other. Only Leonard, Shary's brother, who has returned from his travels around the world to spend some time with the two pairs, seems to sense what is happening. The balance of Matteo's marriage begins to crack, and the growing tension seems to corrode the two families. While the rest of the household is out preparing for David's birthday party, Matteo goes to David's bedroom, and they have sex.  When Francesca returns, she has no front-door keys and enters the house through a patio door into David's room where she finds the two men having sex.  She runs out, and Matteo runs after her.  She dashes around a corner and into the street where she is hit and killed by a car. Later, Matteo, Shary, Diego, and David are having supper. Shary asks Matteo accusingly where he was at the time of the accident, and the movie ends as he begins to cry.

Cast
 Alessandro Gassmann − Diego
 Massimo Poggio − Matteo
 Maria de Medeiros − Francesca
 Michela Cescon − Shary
 Thyago Alves − David
 Christo Jivkov − Leonard
 Piera Degli Esposti − Giuliana
 Daniele De Angelis − Orazio
 Marianna De Rossi − Chicca
Source:

Film Festivals
The film was presented at the following film festivals :

2009: Italy - Mostra Internazionale d'Arte Cinematografica
2009: Italy - Festival Internazionale del Film di Roma
2009: Brazil - São Paulo International Film Festival
2010: Brazil - Rio de Janeiro International Film Festival

References

External links
 
 

2009 films
Italian drama films
2009 drama films
Italian LGBT-related films
2000s Italian-language films
LGBT-related drama films
Gay-related films
2009 LGBT-related films
2000s English-language films
2000s Italian films
2009 multilingual films
Italian multilingual films